Carl Axel Fredrik Pettersson (13 April 1874 – 31 May 1962) was a Swedish curler who won a silver medal at the 1924 Winter Olympics.

Pettersson was a manager of a clothing company and chairman of the Swedish association of the clothing industry. He was also Consul General for Hungary in Sweden and member of the Stockholm’s Council of the 50 Elders. He was awarded the Order of the Polar Star, the Order of Vasa and the Royal Hungarian Order of Merit, among other decorations. He was married to Kerstin, who died 17 years before him; they had three children.

References

External links

1874 births
1962 deaths
Swedish male curlers
Olympic curlers of Sweden
Olympic silver medalists for Sweden
Curlers at the 1924 Winter Olympics
Medalists at the 1924 Winter Olympics
Swedish curling champions